MacGillivray's warbler (Geothlypis tolmiei) is a species of New World warbler. These birds are sluggish and heavy warblers, preferring to spend most of their time on, or near the ground, except when singing.

The MacGillivray's warbler was named by John James Audubon in honor of Scottish ornithologist William MacGillivray, although the proper credit to its discovery goes to John Kirk Townsend. The specific name was given in honor of William Fraser Tolmie.

Adult MacGillivray's warblers are an olive-green color on their upperparts and dull yellow below. Males have black heads and breasts, while females and immature birds have drab light gray heads; both males and females have broken white eye-rings. The song is a series of repeated two-note phrases, gradually increasing in volume, ending with two single notes: jeeter jeeter jeeter JEETER JEETER jeet jeet. MacGillivray's warblers are very similar to their eastern counterpart, the mourning warbler, the primary difference between the two species being the mourning warbler's lack of an eye-ring.

Measurements:

 Length: 
 Weight: 
 Wingspan: 

MacGillivray's warblers are migratory and spend their summers in temperate forests in the western United States, and in boreal forests of west Canada. In autumn, these birds migrate to Central America, where they stay in temperate shrublands for the winter.

References

External links
 MacGillivray's warbler – Oporornis tolmiei – USGS Patuxent Bird Identification InfoCenter
 MacGillivray's warbler Species Account – Cornell Lab of Ornithology
MacGillivray's warbler videos on the Internet Bird Collection
MacGillivray's warbler photo gallery VIREO
Photo-High Res--(Close-up)
 

MacGillivray's warbler
Native birds of Western Canada
Native birds of the Western United States

MacGillivray's warbler
MacGillivray's warbler